Christophe Honoré (born 10 April 1970) is a French writer and film and theatre director.

Career
Honoré was born in Carhaix, Finistère. After moving to Paris in 1995, he wrote articles in Les Cahiers du Cinéma. He started writing soon after. His 1996 book Tout contre Léo (Close to Leo) talks about HIV and is aimed at young adults; he made it into a film in 2002. He wrote other books for young adults throughout the late 1990s. His first play, Les Débutantes, was performed at Avignon's Off Festival in 1998. In 2005, he returned to Avignon to present Dionysos impuissant in the "In" Festival, with Joana Preiss and Louis Garrel playing the leads.

A well-known director, he is considered an "auteur" in French cinema. His 2006 film Dans Paris has led him to be considered by French critics as the heir to the Nouvelle Vague cinema. In 2007, Les Chansons d'amour was one of the films selected to be in competition at the 2007 Cannes Film Festival. Honoré is openly gay, and some of his movies or screenplays (among them Les Filles ne savent pas nager, Dix-sept fois Cécile Cassard and Les Chansons d'amour) deal with gay or lesbian relations. His film Plaire, aimer et courir vite (Sorry Angel), about a writer who has contracted HIV in the 1990s, won the Louis Delluc Prize for Best Film in 2018. Honoré has been the screenwriter for some of Gaël Morel's films. The actors Louis Garrel and Chiara Mastroianni have each had roles in several of his films.

Honoré has also directed several operas for the stage. For the Opéra de Lyon he directed Poulenc's Dialogues of the Carmelites in 2013,  Debussy's Pelléas et Mélisande in 2015, and Verdi's Don Carlos in 2018. He also presented his production of Mozart's Così fan tutte at the Aix-en-Provence Festival and the Edinburgh Festival in 2016, and Puccini's Tosca at Aix-en-Provence in 2019; both of these productions adopted a radical approach to traditional works.

In the summer of 2020 Honoré's rehearsals of his stage production of Le Côté de Guermantes, based on the third volume of Proust's In Search of Lost Time, were interrupted by restrictions to combat the COVID-19 epidemic and it became impossible to present it at the Comédie-Française as planned. With his troupe of actors he decided to make a film about the production and the uncertainties they were now facing, and the film Guermantes was released in September 2021.

Filmography

Novels
1995 : Tout contre Léo (jeunesse), turned into a film in 2002
1996 : C'est plus fort que moi (jeunesse)
1997 : Je joue très bien tout seul (jeunesse)
1997 : L'Affaire petit Marcel (jeunesse)
1997 : L’Infamille (Éditions de l'Olivier)
1998 : Zéro de lecture (jeunesse)
1998 : Une toute petite histoire d'amour (jeunesse)
1998 : Je ne suis pas une fille à papa (jeunesse)
1999 : Les Nuits où personne ne dort (jeunesse)
1999 : Mon cœur bouleversé  (jeunesse)
1999 : Bretonneries (jeunesse)
1999 : La Douceur (Éditions de L'Olivier)

Theatre and opera

Actor
 1998: Les Débutantes
 2001: Le Pire du troupeau
 2004: Beautiful Guys
 2005: Dionysos impuissant
 2012: La Faculté
 2012: Un jeune se tue
 2012: Nouveau Roman
 2015: Violentes femmes

Director
 2009 : Angelo, Tyrant of Padua by Victor Hugo, Festival d'Avignon
 2012 : Nouveau Roman, Festival d'Avignon, Théâtre national de la Colline
 2013 : Dialogues of the Carmelites by Francis Poulenc, Opéra National de Lyon
 2015 : Fin de l'Histoire by Witold Gombrowicz, Théâtre de Lorient
 2015 : Pelléas et Mélisande by Claude Debussy, Opéra National de Lyon
 2016 : Così fan tutte by Mozart, Aix-en-Provence Festival and Edinburgh International Festival
 2018 : Don Carlos by Verdi, Opéra National de Lyon
 2019 : Les Idoles by Christophe Honoré, Odéon-Théâtre de l'Europe
 2019 : Tosca by Puccini, Aix-en-Provence Festival

References
 Gerstner, David A. and Julien Nahmias. Christophe Honoré: A Critical Introduction. 
 Rees-Roberts, Nick. French Queer Cinema. Edinburgh University Press, 2008.

External links

1970 births
Living people
People from Finistère
20th-century French novelists
21st-century French novelists
French film directors
French gay writers
LGBT film directors
French LGBT screenwriters
French male screenwriters
French screenwriters
French male novelists
20th-century French male writers
21st-century French male writers
Rennes 2 University alumni
21st-century LGBT people